Charles F. Wilcox (1845–1905) was an American architect practicing in Providence, Rhode Island.

Life
Wilcox was born in 1845 in Georgia, to a family that relocated to Providence in his infancy.  He trained with local architect Charles P. Hartshorn, becoming his partner in 1873.  Their firm, Hartshorn & Wilcox, lasted until the end of 1879, briefly before Hartshorn's death in 1880.  Wilcox continued practicing alone until 1895, when he made draftsman Gideon Gardner Congdon partner in Wilcox & Congdon.  This firm was dissolved in 1899 and Wilcox again continued alone.  He died in Providence in 1905.

Architectural works

Hartshorn & Wilcox, 1873-1879
 1874 - Congdon Street Baptist Church, 15 Congdon St, Providence, Rhode Island
 1874 - Wayland Building, 128 N Main St, Providence, Rhode Island
 Also home to the offices of church architect James Murphy
 1875 - Fourth Baptist Church (Remodeling), Howell St, Providence, Rhode Island
 Demolished
 1876 - Union Baptist Church, 10 East St, Providence, Rhode Island
 Commissioned by the Third Baptist Church
 1877 - Charles Ackerman Duplex, 61-63 Chapin Ave, Providence, Rhode Island

C. F. Wilcox, 1880-1895
 1880 - Burrows Block, 741 Westminster St, Providence, Rhode Island
 1883 - First Baptist Church, 30 Peirce St, East Greenwich, Rhode Island
 1883 - South Baptist Church, 185-187 Ocean St, Providence, Rhode Island
 Demolished
 1884 - Charles Matteson House, 112 Prospect St, Providence, Rhode Island
 1886 - Cyrus E. Lapham House, 64 Harrison St, Pawtucket, Rhode Island
 1890 - Conant Memorial Church, 135 Center Rd, Dudley, Massachusetts
 1893 - Dudley Hill School, Center Rd, Dudley, Massachusetts
 Now owned by Nichols College
 1895 - Aldrich Free Public Library, 299 Main St, Moosup, Connecticut

Wilcox & Congdon, 1895-1899
 1896 - George M. Snow House, 24 Alumni Ave, Providence, Rhode Island

C. F. Wilcox, 1899-1905
 1902 - Narragansett Baptist Church (Old), 20 Ferry Rd, Saunderstown, Rhode Island
 Now serves as the local post office

References

1845 births
1905 deaths
19th-century American architects
Architects from Providence, Rhode Island